James Burrell Jordan (born December 31, 1949) is an American Protestant theologian and author. He is the director of Biblical Horizons ministries, an organisation in Niceville, Florida that publishes books, essays and other media dealing with Bible commentary, Biblical theology, and liturgy. It adheres to biblical absolutism including Young Earth Creationism and is committed to the concept of biblical theocracy.

Early life and education
Jordan was born in Athens, Georgia. After public school, Jordan attended the University of Georgia, where he received a Bachelor of Arts in comparative literature. While in college, he participated in the Campus Crusade for Christ and Young Americans for Freedom. 

He served four years as a lieutenant in the United States Air Force, first as an Administration Management Officer and then as a military historian. He attended Reformed Theological Seminary in Jackson, Mississippi, before ultimately earning an Master's degree and Th.M. from Westminster Theological Seminary in Philadelphia, Pennsylvania. His master's thesis was on slavery in the Bible. In 1993, Jordan received a D. Litt. from the Central School of Religion for his dissertation on the dietary laws of Moses.

Career
After his 1982 ordination in the Association of Reformed Churches, Jordan served for five years alongside Ray Sutton as associate pastor of Westminster Presbyterian Church, in Tyler, Texas. He was also the director of Geneva Ministries and Geneva Divinity School.

After the work in Tyler unravelled into discord and internal dissension, Jordan developed his own platform for writing, Biblical Horizons, a Niceville, Florida-based research and publishing ministry. Biblical Horizons emphasizes the Trinity and biblical absolutism with a covenant-historical approach to interpretation and a focus on biblical theocracy, eschatology and worship.

Jordan has also served since 2000 as head of the Department of Biblical Studies at the Biblical Theological Seminary, St. Petersburg, Russia, where he teaches Old Testament and Eschatology.

In 2011, Wipf and Stock published a Festschrift in Jordan's honor. Glory of Kings: A Festschrift in Honor of James B. Jordan was edited by Peter J. Leithart, and included contributions from Rich Lusk, Douglas Wilson and John Frame.

In 2015, Jordan moved to Birmingham, AL to join Peter Leithart in the work of Theopolis Institute. Following a stroke in 2017, he announced in 2019 the closing down of Biblical Horizons and his endorsement of Theopolis Institute as continuing his work.

Thought
Bill DeJong characterizes Jordan's approach to biblical hermeneutics as "pastoral typology" - that is, seeing biblical typology as pointing not just to the work of Christ, but also to Christian worship.

Publications
Jordan has written many articles and books, including:

 
 
 
 
 
 
 
 
 
 
 
  A defense of Young Earth creationism against the framework interpretation of Genesis 1.

References

External links
Biblical Horizons – official website
Articles by Jordan
 Audio of lectures and sermons by Jordan

1949 births
Living people
Writers from Athens, Georgia
American Presbyterian ministers
American Calvinist and Reformed theologians
Christian reconstructionism
University of Georgia alumni
Westminster Theological Seminary alumni
United States Air Force officers
20th-century Calvinist and Reformed theologians
21st-century Calvinist and Reformed theologians
American biblical scholars
American Christian creationists
Bible commentators